Carex exilis, common name coastal sedge or meager sedge, is a species of Carex native to North America, with several disjunct populations from southern Canada to the Gulf Coast. It is rare in much of its range and is listed as an endangered species in  Connecticut by state authorities.

References

exilis
Flora of North America